The principle of good enough or "good enough" principle is a rule in software and systems design. It indicates that consumers will use products that are good enough for their requirements, despite the availability of more advanced technology.

See also

80:20 rule
Heuristic
KISS principle
Minimalism (computing)
Perfect is the enemy of good
Proof of concept
Rule of thumb
Satisficing
Worse is Better
You aren't gonna need it

References

 ''Software Craftsmanship: The New Imperative'
 Creating a Software Engineering Culture
 Fundamental Concepts for the Software Quality Engineer, Volume 2
 Software Creativity 2.0
 Software War Stories: Case Studies in Software Management

External links 
 "The New Mantra of Tech: It's Good Enough" (Gizmodo by Mark Wilson April 27, 2009)

Software architecture